Chililabombwe is a constituency of the National Assembly of Zambia. It covers Chililabombwe in Copperbelt Province.

List of MPs

References

Constituencies of the National Assembly of Zambia
1968 establishments in Zambia
Constituencies established in 1968